William Lewis Guy (September 30, 1919 – April 26, 2013) was an American politician who was the governor of the U.S. state of North Dakota from 1961 to 1973.  Guy was North Dakota's longest-serving governor in state history, serving two consecutive two-year terms and two four-year terms in office.

Biography
Guy was born in Devils Lake, North Dakota.  After receiving his B.S. degree from North Dakota Agricultural College (NDAC), where he was a member of Sigma Alpha Epsilon and Blue Key National Honor Society. He served in the U.S. Navy in World War II as a gunnery officer, achieving the rank of lieutenant. He received a master's degree from the University of Minnesota, and then became the assistant county agent for Cass County. With his wife, the former Jean Mason, whom he married on January 30, 1943, Guy began farming at Amenia, North Dakota, in 1948 and taught agricultural economics at NDAC during the winter quarters.

He served in the North Dakota House of Representatives for one term from 1959 to 1961.  In the legislature, Guy served as assistant minority leader. He died in the morning of April 26, 2013 at West Fargo, North Dakota. He was 93. He had Alzheimer's disease.

Years as Governor
His election as governor on the Democratic-Nonpartisan League ticket finally established the two-party system in North Dakota. As governor, Guy served two two-year terms and two four-year terms. He began modernizing state government by implementing the new Office of Management and Budget. During his terms, the state hospital's patient load was reduced from 2,600 to 600 and eight regional mental health districts were established. Guy organized the five-state Old West Trail Tourist Loop. The interstate highway system, 350 Minuteman missiles, the anti-ballistic missiles site, and Garrison Diversion were large federal projects that came to North Dakota during Guy's watch. He was instrumental in bringing three sugar beet refineries and large scale coal-fired electrical generation to North Dakota. Governor Guy was selected by President Lyndon B. Johnson to observe the first presidential elections in South Vietnam. He originated the concept of an interpretive North Dakota Heritage Center and promoted its construction. The Theodore Roosevelt Rough Rider Award was established by Governor Guy as North Dakota's highest recognition. Guy organized and served as the first chairman of the Midwest Governors' Conference in 1962. In 1966, he was elected chairman of the National Governors' Conference.  He was an unsuccessful candidate for the United States Senate in 1974.

See also
North Dakota United States Senate election, 1974
 Politics of North Dakota

References

External links

National Governors Association

|-

|-

|-

1919 births
2013 deaths
United States Navy personnel of World War II
American Presbyterians
Democratic Party governors of North Dakota
Military personnel from North Dakota
North Dakota State University alumni
People from Cass County, North Dakota
People from Devils Lake, North Dakota
United States Navy officers
University of Minnesota alumni
20th-century American politicians
Democratic Party members of the North Dakota House of Representatives